Umberto Di Primio (born 1 December 1968 in Ripa Teatina) is an Italian politician.

A former member of the far-right parties Italian Social Movement and National Alliance, he joined the centre-right party The People of Freedom in 2009 and then Forza Italia in 2013. He was elected Mayor of Chieti on 28 March 2010 and took office on 30 March. Di Primio was re-elected for a second term on 19 June 2015.

See also
2010 Italian local elections
2015 Italian local elections
List of mayors of Chieti

References

External links
 
 

1968 births
Living people
Mayors of places in Abruzzo
People from Chieti
Brothers of Italy politicians
Forza Italia (2013) politicians
Italian Social Movement politicians
National Alliance (Italy) politicians
The People of Freedom politicians